Walter Road is a road in the north-eastern suburbs of Perth, Western Australia. Formerly a continuous road, it is now discontinuous at Tonkin Highway. The western section of the road is known as Walter Road West, and the eastern section of the road is known as Walter Road East.

Route description

Walter Road West
Walter Road West commences as a four lane road, and as a continuation of Hamer Parade.  to the south-west, Hamer Parade terminates at a roundabout intersection with Central Avenue. From Hamer Parade, Walter Road West heads north, between Mount Lawley Golf Club and Walter Road Reserve. The road then bends to the north-east, passing through the urban areas of Inglewood, Dianella, and Bedford. The traffic light controlled intersections on this section are Dundas Road and Homer Street, Grand Promenade and Coode Street.

Approximately  after its western terminus, Walter Road West enters the Morley commercial district. To the south is the Galleria Shopping Centre, and to the north is Coventry Village. The road takes a bend to face it due east. Traffic light controlled intersections on this section are Russell Street, Wellington Road and Collier Road.

Walter Road West then exits the Morley commercial district after Collier Road, passing through housing in Morley. After the intersection with Crimea Street, which is a traffic light controlled intersection, Walter Road West is a two lane road. Near the road's eastern terminus, there is a roundabout with Embleton Avenue. Just to the east of the roundabout, Walter Road West terminates at a cul-de-sac. To the south of the roundabout, Embleton Avenue leads to Broun Avenue, which bridges over Tonkin Highway, leading to Walter Road East.

Walter Road East
Walter Road East commences as a four lane road and as a continuation of Broun Avenue at the intersection of Beechboro Road North. From there, the Road heads due east along the border of Bayswater / Morley, and later Bassendean / Eden Hill. Walter Road East briefly reduces to two lanes at the roundabout with Iolanthe Street, but otherwise remains a four lane road. The only set of traffic lights between the two termini is with Ivanhoe Street. The eastern terminus of Walter Road East is with Lord Street. There is a small,  section of Walter Road east of the Lord Street terminus that is cut off from the rest of the road.

History

The earliest sign of what is now Walter Road was in the 1880s, as a track that followed the boundary of land grants Q1 and P. In 1887,  the Perth Road Board decided to link the track to Perth. The route taken by the track is roughly the present day route of Walter Road, and it was used as an alternative route to reach West Guildford (now Bassendean). It was at first known as Government Road.

At some point in the early 20th century, the track was made into a plank road. A small rural community named Morley Park developed on Government Road. The Morley that exists today bears no visual signs of this early development. In May 1932, the Bayswater Road Board submitted an application for Commonwealth funding for widening and improving Government Road as a way of creating employment during the Great Depression. The works occurred during 1932 and the start of 1933.

In 1944, the Main Roads Department renamed Government Road to Walter Road. There are conflicting reports as to the origin of the name. One option is Walter Browne, who was born in Bayswater in 1903 and lived there for some time. Another possibility is Edgar Walter Hamer, who worked for Gold Estates, a property development company, and was Chairman of the Perth Road Board (precursor to the City of Stirling). Another possibility is Walter Padbury, who was a pioneer and politician.

In the 1960s, it was decided that Walter Road would be split into two when the planned Beechboro-Gosnells Highway was built. This was in line with the vision of Walter Road to be serving the Morley business district, rather than a through road. The highway, now named Tonkin Highway, was built in the early 1980s, splitting Walter Road into two sections. A bridge across Tonkin Highway was instead built at Broun Avenue just to the south of Walter Road. A small section of what used to be Walter Road is now Cherry Court.

Junction list

Walter Road West

Walter Road East

See also
List of major roads in Perth, Western Australia

References

Roads in Perth, Western Australia